Banavie railway station is a railway station on the West Highland Line serving the village of Banavie, although it is much closer to Caol, Scotland. It is sited between Corpach and Fort William,  from Banavie Junction, just north of Fort William. ScotRail provide all services at, and manage, the station.

History 

Banavie station opened along with the Mallaig Extension Railway on 1 April 1901. It comprises a single platform on the north side of the line. The station was host to a LNER camping coach from 1936 to 1939. Another station named "Banavie" existed above the Neptune's Staircase flight of locks that was renamed Banavie Pier railway station and closed to passengers in 1939. 'Banavie Junction' for the pier branch was located just to the south of the level crossing at Banavie.

Signalling 

From the time of its opening in 1901, the Mallaig Extension Railway was worked throughout by the electric token system. A signal box, named "Banavie Canal Bridge", was located at the west end of the station, on the north side of the line. It did not become a token station until 4 February 1912, but originally existed to control the nearby level crossings and the adjacent swing bridge over the Caledonian Canal.

Because of the continuing requirement to operate the swing bridge locally, Banavie was chosen as the location for the control centre for the West Highland Line's new radio signalling system. Banavie signalling centre opened on 14 June 1987 when it replaced the old Canal Bridge signal box. The Radio Electronic Token Block signalling was commissioned on 6 December 1987. The control centre covers train movements as far south as Helensburgh and Oban, and Mallaig to the west. Local train movements in Fort William, and the nearby freight yard at Inverlochy, are controlled by the mechanical signal box at Fort William Junction.

Facilities 
The single platform is equipped with a shelter (inside which is a payphone), a bench and some bike racks, the latter located in the car park. There is step-free access to the car park. As there are no facilities to purchase tickets, passengers must buy one in advance, or from the guard on the train.

Passenger volume 

The statistics cover twelve month periods that start in April.

Services 
On weekdays and Saturdays, four trains a day call here in either direction.

See also
 Banavie
 Banavie Railway Swing Bridge
 Banavie Swing Bridge

References

Bibliography

External links

 RAILSCOT on Mallaig Extension Railway
Video footage of Banavie Station

Former North British Railway stations
Railway stations in Highland (council area)
Railway stations served by ScotRail
Railway stations in Great Britain opened in 1901